Coles is an unincorporated community located in Amite County, Mississippi, United States.

Coles has a zip code that is 39633.

References

Unincorporated communities in Amite County, Mississippi
Unincorporated communities in Mississippi
McComb micropolitan area